David Dunlop (22 December 1859 – 3 September 1931) was a Scottish sailor and Olympic Champion. Dunlop  competed for the Royal Clyde Yacht Club at the 1908 Summer Olympics.

He was a crew member of the Scottish boat Hera, which won the gold medal in the 12 metre class.

References

External links
 
 

Place of birth missing
1859 births
1931 deaths
Sailors at the 1908 Summer Olympics – 12 Metre
Olympic medalists in sailing
Olympic sailors of Great Britain
British male sailors (sport)
Scottish Olympic medallists
Scottish male sailors (sport)
Medalists at the 1908 Summer Olympics
Olympic gold medallists for Great Britain